Scopula palpata is a moth of the family Geometridae. It is found in Kenya.

References

Endemic moths of Kenya
Moths described in 1932
Taxa named by Louis Beethoven Prout
palpata
Moths of Africa